Jahnavi Barua is an Indian author from Assam. She is the author of 'Next Door', a critically acclaimed collection of short stories set in Assam with insurgency as the background. Barua lives in Bangalore, and obtained her MBBS at Gauhati Medical College but does not practice medicine. She studied creative writing in the United Kingdom.

A Rebirth is not so much about parenting as it is about the unique bond between mother and  child. The particular period when the mother carries the unborn child is expressed beautifully in her literary work.

Undertow  is a novel about migration, exile and loneliness, all themes we will be struggling with in a post-pandemic world.

Bibliography
 Next Door (Penguin India, 2008)
 Rebirth (Penguin India, 2010)
Undertow (Penguin India, 2020)

Nominations and awards
 2020 JCB Prize for Literature longlist
 2012 Commonwealth Book Prize shortlist
 2011 Man Asian Literary Prize, shortlist, Rebirth
 2009 Frank O'Connor International Short Story Award, longlist.
 2006 Short Fiction contest hosted by Unisun Publishers (Second prize, Children's fiction category).
 2005 Short Fiction contest hosted by Unisun Publishers
 Charles Wallace India Trust Scholarship for Creative Writing

See also
 Literature from North East India
 Indian English Literature

References

External links
 Profile, tribuneindia.com; accessed 6 April 2015.
 Jahnavi Barua at Penguin India

Living people
Writers from Assam
Indian women short story writers
21st-century Indian women writers
21st-century Indian writers
21st-century Indian short story writers
Women writers from Assam
Year of birth missing (living people)